Shin Mi-Nauk was a senior queen consort of King Minkhaung I of Ava from 1400 to 1407. She was the mother of Crown Prince Minye Kyawswa, who is one of the most celebrated generals in Burmese history, and King Thihathu of Ava. Mi-Nauk was a daughter of Hsongamhpa, the saopha (chief) of Shan state of Mohnyin. She was married to Minkhaung, son King Swa Saw Ke of Ava when Ava and Mohnyin were in a rare period of good relations in 1389. From 1391 to 1395, she gave birth to three sons, Minye Kyawswa, Minye Thihathu and Minye Kyawhtin, and a daughter, Saw Pyei Chantha at Pyinzi, which was Minkhaung's fief.

Mi-Nauk became of queen of Ava on 25 November 1400 when Minkhaung ascended to the throne of Ava. Ava at that time was fighting against the Kingdom of Hanthawaddy in the south. In May 1408, Minkhaung invaded the Hanthawaddy country and reached the outskirts of Pegu. As it was the custom of the day, she accompanied Minkhaung during his military expeditions. Three months later, c. July 1408, the Hanthawaddy army counter-attacked and soundly defeated the Ava army. In the process of chaotic retreat, Mi-Nauk was captured by the Hanthawaddy army. King Razadarit of Hanthawaddy made a queen of his. Inside Razadarit's harem was her daughter Saw Pyei Chantha, who was captured at Arakan by the Hanthawaddy army, and also made a queen of Razadarit.

Minye Kyawswa in particular would not forgive Razadarit for putting his mother and sister in the harem. He was determined to defeat Razadarit in war, and came close to accomplishing it. But he could not rescue his mother and sister as he died from battle wounds in March 1415.

Notes

References

Bibliography
 
 
 
 

Queens consort of Ava
Burmese people of Shan descent
14th-century Burmese women
15th-century Burmese women
14th-century Tai people